
Girish Kohli (born 29 November 1983 in Mumbai) is an Indian author and screenwriter. He is the writer of the thrillers Mom (2017) and HIT: The First Case (2022) and historical war drama Kesari (2019). His book Marathon Baba was one of the best-selling books of 2012 in India (No. 13 on the Nielsen's Top 50 Bestseller charts in India). Kohli was educated as a software engineer from Thadomal Shahani Engineering College in Mumbai and worked several jobs before becoming a full-time writer.

References

External links

1983 births
Indian male novelists
Living people
Indian male screenwriters
People from Mumbai